Dalip Mehta is a retired Indian diplomat. He was India's Ambassador to Bhutan and the Central Asian Republics of Uzbekistan, Tajikistan and Turkmenistan. He was also the Secretary of Ministry of Foreign Affairs, Government of India and Dean of Foreign Service Institute, India from 1998 till 2002. Dalip Mehta is a Trustee of Foundation for Universal Responsibility of His Holiness the Dalai Lama and a Director of the India-Bhutan Foundation.

Education
Mehta went to The Doon School for his primary education and then to University of Cambridge.

References 

Living people
The Doon School alumni
Alumni of the University of Cambridge
Ambassadors of India to Bhutan
Year of birth missing (living people)
Ambassadors of India to Uzbekistan
Ambassadors of India to Turkmenistan
Ambassadors of India to Tajikistan